Pronotacanthus sahelalmae is an extinct spiny eel that lived in marine environments of what is now Lebanon during the Santonian.

See also

 Prehistoric fish
 List of prehistoric bony fish

References

Late Cretaceous fish
Elopiformes
Cretaceous fish of Europe